Words is the ninth studio album by American country music singer Sara Evans. She released it independently on July 21, 2017 via her own Born to Fly Records. The lead single is "Marquee Sign".

Content
The album features fourteen songs, all of which have at least one female writer. Evans said that this was unintentional. She also told Billboard that "Eighty percent of this album will make you cry, and twenty percent will make you so happy. It's really deep with incredible lyrics. That's why I decided to call the album Words." Evans wrote one of the songs, "Letting You Go", about her son Avery. An acoustic version of Evans' Number One hit "A Little Bit Stronger" was also included as its final track.

"Long Way Down" was previously recorded by The SteelDrivers on their 2015 album, The Muscle Shoals Recordings.

Critical reception
Rating it 4 out of 5 stars, Stephen Thomas Erlewine of AllMusic wrote that "it never flaunts its diversity; instead, its eclecticism is casual, with Evans sliding from stripped-back country-folk to breezy modern pop with ease" and "there's a measured assurance to her performances that lends the album warmth." Matt Bjorke of Roughstock was positive, stating that "it finds her refreshed and sounding better than she did on her past couple of releases".

Commercial performance
The album debuted at No. 4 on the Top Country Albums chart and No. 2 on the Independent Albums chart, selling 9,900 copies in the first week. It has sold 26,800 copies in the United States as of March 2018.

Track listing

Personnel 
 Sara Evans – lead vocals, backing vocals
 Gordon Mote – acoustic piano, synthesizers, synth pads, Hammond B3 organ, strings, marimba
 J.T. Corenflos – electric guitars, guitar solos
 Ilya Toshinsky – acoustic guitar, electric guitars, banjo, bouzouki, dobro, mandolin
 Aubrey Haynie – fiddle, mandolin
 Jimmie Lee Sloas – bass
 Matt Chamberlain – drums, congas, cymbals, hand drums, percussion, shaker, tambourine
 Lesley Evans Lyons – backing vocals
 Olivia Evans – backing vocals
 Matt Evans – backing vocals
 Ashley Evans Simpson – backing vocals
 Shane Stevens – backing vocals

Charts

References

2017 albums
Sara Evans albums
Albums produced by Mark Bright (record producer)